Tiberiu Kallo (born 7 August 1943) is a Romanian former footballer. He has three brothers, two of them Mihai and Nicolae were also footballers who managed to play in Romania's top division Divizia A.

International career
Tiberiu Kallo played five games and scored one goal at international level for Romania, making his debut under coach Constantin Teașcă on 29 October 1967, when he came as a substitute and replaced Florea Voinea in the 63rd minute of a friendly which ended 0–0 against Poland. He scored his only goal for the national team in a friendly match which ended 1–1 against Austria. Kallo's final appearance for Romania was in a 1970 World Cup qualification match which ended with a 2–0 victory against Switzerland. He also appeared once for Romania's Olympic team.

Notes

References

External links

Tiberiu kallo at Labtof.ro

1943 births
Living people
Romanian footballers
Romania international footballers
Association football midfielders
Liga I players
Liga II players
FCV Farul Constanța players
FCM Târgoviște players
People from Codlea